Great Pond Mountain, also known locally as  Great Hill, is a mountain in Hancock County, Maine, United States. It is near Orland, Maine.

References

External links
Great Pond Mountain Conservation Trust

Mountains of Hancock County, Maine
Mountains of Maine